The Fannin Battleground State Historic Site commemorates the Battle of Coleto Creek, a battle of the Texas Revolution, fought on March 19 and 20, 1836 between Texian forces commanded by Col. James W. Fannin and the Mexican Army commanded by Mexican General Jose de Urrea. Eventually surrounded and outnumbered, Fannin surrendered to the Mexican Army. He and his troops were executed several days later at nearby Presidio La Bahia.

Fannin Battleground State Historic Site is located east of Goliad in Goliad County, Texas. The citizens of Goliad County donated the 14-acre battleground to the State of Texas around 1913. The state originally named it Fannin State Park. The site is currently operated by the Texas Historical Commission and features a stone obelisk, interpretive exhibit, group pavilion, and picnic area.

See also

List of Texas state historic sites
National Register of Historic Places listings in Goliad County, Texas
Recorded Texas Historic Landmarks in Goliad County

References

External links

Fannin Battleground State Historic Site website

Texas state historic sites
Protected areas of Goliad County, Texas
Texas Revolution monuments and memorials